Isabel Gómez-Bassols is a psychologist, writer, and broadcaster in the United States. She is a radio talk show host on Univisión's nationwide Spanish-language radio network, and also appears regularly on television.

Career
Gómez-Bassols was born in Cuba; she has lived in Miami for most of her life. She has postgraduate degrees in education, psychology and psychological diagnosis. She worked as a schoolteacher, and later as a psychologist, for the public school system of Miami-Dade County, where she became head of the psychological services department. She has written five self-help books and two children's books.

Gómez-Bassols has hosted a nationwide daily talk show, Dra. Isabel, since 1998, beginning on Radio Unica. The show has been broadcast by Univision Radio since 2004. On television, she has made regular appearances as a commentator on Cristina and Sábado Gigante, and she has her own weekly television show as well. In 2002 Gómez-Bassols performed as herself (Doctora Isabel) in five episodes of The Bold and the Beautiful.

In January 2008,  Dr. Isabel Gómez-Bassols participated in "Seminarios Puedes Llegar" ("You Can Reach" Seminars) created by Alberto Sardinas. Several celebrities from the Hispanic media and the world of self-help participated during its first run in, including Dr. Nancy Alvarez (psychologist) and Felipe Viel.

References

Further reading
Palacios, Ana Rosa (December 1, 2011). "El Ángel de la Radio". Nexos. (in Spanish)

External links
 (English)

 (English and Spanish)

Living people
American talk radio hosts
American women radio presenters
American self-help writers
American children's writers
American women children's writers
Cuban emigrants to the United States
Year of birth missing (living people)